A technology-critical element (TCE) is a chemical element that is critical to modern and emerging technologies. Technology-critical elements are elements for which a striking acceleration in usage has emerged, relative to past consumption. Many advanced engineering applications, such as clean-energy production, communications and computing, use emergent technologies that utilize numerous chemical elements. Other similar terms used in literature include: critical elements, critical materials, critical raw materials, energy critical elements and elements of security.

In 2013, the U.S. Department of Energy (DOE) created the Critical Materials Institute (CMI) to address the issue. In 2015, the European COST Action TD1407 created a network of scientists working and interested on TCEs, from an environmental perspective to potential human health threats.

A study estimated losses of 61 metals to help the development of circular economy strategies, showing that usespans of, often scarce, tech-critical metals are short.

List of technology-critical elements 

The set of elements usually considered as TCEs vary depending on the source, but they usually include: 

Seventeen rare-earth elements

Six platinum-group elements

Twelve assorted elements

Applications of technology-critical elements

TCEs have a variety of engineering applications in fields such as energy storage, electronics, telecommunication, and transportation. These elements are utilized in cellular phones, batteries, solar panel(s), electric motor(s), and fiber-optic cables. Emerging technologies also incorporate TCEs. Most notably, TCEs are used in the data networking of smart devices tied to the Internet of Things (IoT) and automation.

Environmental considerations

The extraction and processing of TCEs may cause adverse environmental impacts. The reliance on TCEs and critical metals like cobalt can run the risk of the “green curse,” or using certain metals in green technologies whose mining may be damaging to the environment.

The clearing of soil and deforestation that is involved with mining can impact the surrounding biodiversity through land degradation and habitat loss. Acid mine drainage can kill surrounding aquatic life and harm ecosystems. Mining activities and leaching of TCEs can pose significant hazards to human health. Wastewater produced by the processing of TCEs can contaminate groundwater and streams. Toxic dust containing concentrations of metals and other chemicals can be released into the air and surrounding bodies of water.

The mining of TCEs can also exacerbate climate change. Considerable amounts of greenhouse gases can be emitted from burning fossil fuels and processing ore. Deforestation caused by mining results in the release of stored carbon from the ground to the atmosphere in the form of carbon dioxide (CO2).

See also
Conflict resource
List of elements facing shortage
Rare-earth element
Strategic material
Renewable energy#Conservation areas, recycling and rare-earth elements

References

Sets of chemical elements
Scarcity
History of technology
Natural resources